Liburn Jupolli (born 11 December 1989 in Pristina, Kosovo) is an Albanian Musician/Composer from Kosovo.

Prof.PhD. Liburn Jupolli is a composer, multi-instrumentalist, inventor, producer with more than 15 years of experience.

Released 25 music albums, performed/presented in internationally renowned music festivals/academic venues, invented 2 new instruments, composed for more than 60 different productions in theater, film, animation, fine arts, games and is a founder of the first Modern Music Faculty in Kosovo and Center for Modern Music Research of UBT-University or Business and Technology where he works as a lecturer.

He is also the founder of the philanthropic Foundation IL-IR and "MAGMUS" publishing house.

Founder – Faculty of Modern Music, Digital Production and Management Founder/Director – CMMDPM – Center for Modern Music, Digital Production and Management.

Instruments

Octo
The Octo is the 1st instrument built in collaboration with Ari Lehtela (luthier-USA/Finland) it features:
8 strings, 43 microtonal frets, 8 separate outputs.

Clossor
The Clossor is the 1st remodeled instrument it features work in external design,1 new option of pre-recording in cassette-mode mounted in the back part of the body fretless neck and soon a switchable bridge from bass to contrabass.

The Sentinel
The Sentinel is an 88 string amplified instrument played by a special keyboard system which utilises electromotors to vibrate the strings.

Nematocera
Nematocera is a 67 string amplified instrument and in a kind of microtonal, electric koto.

Stragonaal
Stragonaal is a percussive metallic, amplified instrument made out of several metallic bowls. It is played by striking as with regular percussion instruments and by bowing.
This version is a 1st prototype of what the real on is going to be and it has less properties to it.

Bands

Om Quartet

The Freelancers

Elektorati Intelektual

Me T'Njofshem

Works

Piano 
 In Memoriam (2006)
 Sight of a Crypt (2007)
 Dance of the humanised Myrrh creatures (2007)
 Dead Circus (2007)
 Micro-suite en blanc et noir (2015)

Strings 

 Eta Carinae (2006) for solo violin
 3 Dadaist Dances (2009), for string trio
 Mali me vesh (2015), for Octo solo

Electroacoustic 

 A world of Abel Dereck Black (2011)
 Svens first dream (2012)
 Malangt (2015)

Discography

With Om Quartet
2008 – Om Quatet Live at Prishtina Jazz Festival

With The Freelancers
2012 – N’Kuti

With Elektorati Intelektual
2014 – Demokoroacia EP

With Me T’Njofshem a.k.a. MTNJ
2012 – Shume Cica

2016 "Arc"

Dallendyshe N’Vullkan

Fingerling

Krejt familja jon Djalosha

Crystal Fire

Me ker

Reunion)Greatest Hits)

Mtnj 1085

Kingdom of Electric Insects

Rroni nuk plaket

Hyper Multi

Panki me vi

Takimet e Franc Listtit me Take on me take me out

Ska sepse edhe pershkak

Prej Kosoves drejt n’Evrope

Live in Iceland

Po m’tingllon qysh po m’pelqen

Perfekto

Lightweight Temperaycher

Teko Sacke

Tom Entraintion

References

 https://www.koha.net/kulture/139670/filarmonia-e-kosoves-me-muzike-feston-perkujton-dhe-shenon-formimin-e-ushtrise/
 https://www.koha.net/kulture/139704/koncerti-i-kryeveprave-kulmon-me-mag-hyllus-per-ushtrine-e-vendit/
 https://www.koha.net/kulture/163332/gof-thyen-izolimin-ne-udhetimin-virtual-qe-projekton-te-ardhmen/
 https://www.koha.net/kulture/189574/dyshja-qe-sfidon-konceptin-e-imazhit-merr-cmimin-gjon-mili/
 https://www.koha.net/kulture/120284/post-chestra-si-platforme-per-zhvillimin-e-kreativitetit/
 https://www.koha.net/kulture/118082/sonte-ne-kino-armata-ne-prishtine-solo-koncert-i-liburn-jupollit/
 https://www.koha.net/kulture/90713/muzikanti-nga-kosova-themelon-ansamblin-multietnik-ne-paris/
 https://www.koha.net/kulture/107425/syte-oborri-e-blla-blla-blla-bashkohen-ne-kopshtin-e-lumbardhit/
 https://amazeberlin2017.sched.com/artist/liburn_jupolli.6unxxl1
 https://www.peter-sheppard-skaerved.com/2010/01/liburn-jupolli-eta-carinae/
 https://www.kultplus.com/muzika/liburn-jupolli-sonte-do-sjelle-koncertin-gravitas-ne-armata/
 http://forumikulturor.net/?page=1,6,247#.YElDpmhKhPb
 http://www.stacion.org/sq/Liburn-Jupolli-Live-Session-II
 https://www.facebook.com/watch/?v=2217894251800994
 https://www.koha.net/kulture/14295/liburn-jupolli-se-shpejti-lanson-doren-robotike-qe-luan-ne-kitare/

External links 
 https://www.ljupolli.com/ 
https://databazamuzikore-ks.com/
http://fondacioni-il-ir.com/
http://magmus-ks.com/
 Kosovo Arts Website
 Koha Ditore Online Newspaper
 Center for Contemporary arts - Prishtina

Albanian musicians
Living people
1989 births
Inventors of musical instruments